Chirip is a volcano located in the central part of Iturup Island, Kuril Islands, Russia. In lies on the Chirip Peninsula and comprises two twin stratovolcanoes, Chirip and Bogdan Hmelnitskiy. The western side is the steepest, sharing a basin, with a small lake with Bogdan Hmelnitskiy. Basin has features that were created during an eruption. Many types of lava found are basalt, and andesite, small amounts of dacite found.

Notes

See also
List of volcanoes in Russia

References 
 

Iturup
Mountains of the Kuril Islands
Stratovolcanoes of Russia
Volcanoes of the Kuril Islands
Holocene stratovolcanoes